No Cap may refer to:

NoCap (born 1998), American rapper
"No Cap", a song by Future and Young Thug from the 2017 mixtape Super Slimey
"No Cap", a song by Lil Tjay from the 2021 album Destined 2 Win
"No Cap (Remix)", a song by Pop Smoke from the 2021 soundtrack Boogie: The Original Motion Picture Soundtrack